The diving competitions at the 2017 Southeast Asian Games in Kuala Lumpur took place at National Aquatic Centre, Bukit Jalil in Kuala Lumpur from 26 to 30 August 2017.

The 2017 Games featured competitions in thirteen events.

Results

Individual

Men's 1 metre springboard

Women's 1 metre springboard

Men's 3 metre springboard

Women's 3 metre springboard

Men's 10 metre platform

Women's 10 metre platform

Synchronised

Men's synchronised 3 metre springboard

Women's synchronised 3 metre springboard

Men's synchronised 10 metre platform

Women's synchronised 10 metre platform

Mixed synchronised 3 metre springboard

Mixed synchronised 10 metre platform

Team event

References

External links
  

Results